Station to Station (film) may refer to:

 Station to Station (2015 film), 2015 experimental documentary; screened at the 2014 Sundance Film Festival
 Station to Station (2021 film), 2021 psychological drama; opened the 2021 Las Vegas International Film and Screenwriting Festival